Nicholas Kipyator Kiprono arap Biwott (1940 – 11 July 2017) was a Kenyan businessman, politician and philanthropist. Biwott served as a civil servant, Member of Parliament and government minister, during which time he held eight senior ministerial positions during the presidency of Daniel arap Moi.

Early life

Biwott was born in Chebior village, Keiyo District, Rift Valley Province, Kenya on 22 February 1940 to Cheserem Soti, a market trader and cattle herder in Eldoret, and Maria Soti. He attended Tambach Intermediate School from 1951 to 1954, after which he joined Kapsabet High School.

After finishing secondary school in 1959, Biwott began working at the Department of Information in Eldoret, after which he published the Kalenjin monthly newsletter with Kendagor Bett.

He attended the University of Melbourne, Australia, from 1962 to 1964, where he earned a Bachelor of Arts degree in Economics and Political Science, as well as a Diploma in Public Administration.

Biwott then served as a District Officer in Nkubu in the South Imenti Division of Meru District from 1964 to 1965, returning to the University of Melbourne in 1966 to study for a master's degree in Economics under a Commonwealth scholarship.

Political career

Biwott was a member of parliament for 28 years. In 1974 he ran unsuccessfully as a prospective MP for the Keiyo South Constituency. At the next election in 1979 he was successful, standing on KANU ticket in Keiyo-Marakwet, retaining the seat in 1983 and 1988. In 1992, 1997, and 2002 he was elected the MP for Keiyo South Constituency. In the Parliamentary elections held on 27 December 2007, running on a KANU ticket, he lost his seat to Jackson Kiptanui arap Kamai of the Orange Democratic Party (ODM). The ODM swept to victory in all but one of KANU's seats on the Rift Valley.

Following the 2002 election, Biwott served on the Devolution Committee of the Constitution of Kenya Review Commission. Biwott was the only Member of Parliament who abstained on the Constitutional Referendum held in 2005, stating that the Draft Constitution 'would divide the country along ethnic lines'. The draft Constitution was rejected at the Referendum.

More recently, Biwott has fought an election for leadership of KANU, the former party of government and now the official opposition, following years of decline in KANU political fortunes but lost the post to Uhuru Kenyatta following a decision by the Kenyan High Court.

Service in government of Kenya

District Officer

Biwott entered government service in 1965 as the District Officer in South Imenti and Tharaka, Meru District (Jan 1965–66). As District Officer Biwott instituted, on a 'harambee' basis, community fundraising programmes to aid the development of local irrigation projects and roads, to build a health centre at Nkwene and schools at Nkubu and Kanyakine, develop employment at the Igoji quarries and promote the planting of coffee and tea. He was also actively involved in the resettlement of previously European owned land through the 'Land Transfer' programme, part of the 'Million Acres' scheme, and played a central role in the rehabilitation of the Mau Mau, many of whom still remained in the Mau Forest four years after the end of the 'Emergency', helping to persuade them to give up violence and organising the resettlement of many on to their own land.

Ministry of Agriculture

Having completed his master's degree in Australia in 1968, Nicholas Biwott returned to public service in the Ministry of Agriculture, GOK, Personal Assistant to Minister Bruce MacKenzie (1968–70). He coordinated cereal production, the marketing of cereal crops and the management of the Ministry's fertiliser policy, and helped develop research into new strains of wheat and maize more suited to the growing conditions in Kenya. He played a similar co-ordinating role for the Ministry's work with the East African Council of Ministers (MacKenzie was also a member of the council), guiding Kenya's policy in the region in the development of ports, railways and the East African Airways.

Treasury

In 1971 Nicholas Biwott moved to the Treasury as Senior Secretary under the Minister of Finance and Economic Planning, Mwai Kibaki. In 1972 he created and headed the External Aid Division and technical assistance program dealing with external resources, bringing in experts and arranging cultural exchanges. Notably he helped facilitate the establishment of the French School in Nairobi (now called the Lycee Denis Diderot), the French Cultural Centre with the Alliance de Francais, and the German Friederich Ebert Stiftung Foundation in co-operation with the Goethe Institut.

Ministry of Home Affairs

In late 1972 Nicholas Biwott transferred to the Ministry of Home Affairs on the personal recommendation of President Kenyatta to work with his vice-president and the Minister of Home Affairs, Daniel arap Moi.

In 1974 Biwott stood as a candidate for the Keiyo South constituency in the general election of that year but was narrowly defeated.

Following the 1974 election Nicholas Biwott was recalled to the Ministry of Home Affairs as Under Secretary (1974–78) to Minister Daniel arap Moi, Kenya's vice-president. With the ageing President Kenyatta unable to fulfil all the functions of the presidency, Moi took a leading role in the East African region with the result that Nicholas Biwott spent much of the next four years dealing with the Organisation of African Unity, the Commonwealth, the 'non-aligned' states and promoting the 'good neighbourliness' policy with states bordering Kenya.

Kenyatta's death in 1978 saw Daniel arap Moi elevated to the presidency and Nicholas Biwott promoted to Deputy Permanent Secretary in the Office of the President (1978–79).

Minister of State

Following the election of 1979 (in which he was elected Member of Parliament for 1979 Keiyo South election, a seat he retained until December 2007), Nicholas Biwott returned to the Office of the President but now promoted to Minister of State (1979–82) with responsibility for science and technology, cabinet affairs, land settlement and immigration.

Under his auspices the Kenya Medical Research Institute was established in the same year to carry out health science research in Kenya. (Now in its 31st year, KEMRI continues its work as "a leading centre of excellence in the promotion of quality health").

Minister of Regional Development, Science and Technology

In September 1982 he was appointed Minister of Regional Development, Science and Technology. Learning from examples of other regional development policies, notably in Australia and Tennessee in the US, he created two regional development authorities, the Lake Basin Development Authority and the Kerio Valley Development Authority.

Minister of Energy

In September 1983, Nicholas Biwott was made Minister of Energy and Regional Development and in March 1988 (following a reorganisation of ministry portfolios) he became Minister of Energy, a post he held until January 1991.

Over the next seven years he was instrumental in establishing the National Oil Corporation, the building of National Oil storage facilities near Nairobi and connecting them to the Mombasa refinery, and extending the pipeline from Nairobi to Kisumu and Eldoret. This period that saw rapid advances in efforts to improve Kenya's electricity supply and delivery with a rural electrification programme, work beginning on the Sondu Miriu Dam, and the completions of the Masinga Multi Purpose Dam, the Kiambere Hydro Electric Dam and the Turkwell Hydro Electric Multi Purpose Dam.

Minister of East African and Regional Co-operation

Although he remained a member of parliament, Biwott held no position in the Government of Kenya from 1991 until he re-entered government as Minister of State in the Office of the President of East Africa in 1997 before, in January 1998, he established and was appointed Minister of the new Ministry of East African and Regional Co-operation (1998–99).

Nicholas Biwott played a central role in COMESA – the Common Market for East and Central Africa, co-ordinating with COMESA partner Ministers legislation for an East African Road network, legislation for an East African Legislative Assembly, and becoming Chairman of both COMESA and of the East Africa Council of Ministers.

Minister of Trade and Industry, Tourism and East African Cooperation

In September 1999 Biwott's ministerial portfolio was expanded when he became Minister of Trade and Industry, Tourism and East African Cooperation (1999–2001), a post he held for the next three years during which he established a Tourist Trust Fund with the European Union, set up the Tourist Police and re-introduced the East Africa Safari Rallies.

Biwott's promotion of Kenyan tourism met with some praise. He was variously described as "the hardest working minister of tourism Kenya has ever had" and as "the best minister of tourism in 25 years".

In May 2001 (following a further reorganisation of Ministry responsibilities) Nicholas Biwott continued as the Minister of Trade and Industry and East African Tourism (2001–02). Over the next eighteen months he established the Small Medium Trade Trust Fund with the European Union, introduced an Intellectual Property bill which was passed as an Act, accomplished a free trade area with COMESA, established the Africa Trade Insurance Agency to cover foreign investments against political risk, and served as Chairman of the African Caribbean Pacific Group (ACP) at the World Trade Organization.

Businessman

Biwott led an active business life and was regarded as one of Kenya's most successful entrepreneurs.

As a teenager in the late 1950s Biwott worked alongside his father who had established a successful fruit and vegetable business in Eldoret. The young Biwott also borrowed small amounts of money from a local bank with which to expand his own business sideline selling meat products and eggs. Nicholas Biwott continued to expand his own business and in the late 1960s formed ABC Foods selling food and animal feed products.
 
Within a few years Nicholas Biwott was able to invest in farms and businesses, taking advantage of the post-independence banking policies at the time by which Kenyans were granted loans on favourable terms. In 1969, aged 29, Biwott purchased the Eldoret Town International Harvester (IH) dealership (now FMD trading as Lima Ltd). He also purchased a dairy farm in the same year, started an importer exporter business in 1972, purchased two wheat farms in 1974, invested in the sole agency for IH in Kenya for agricultural tractors and implements in 1975, and purchased a local air operator in 1977 (now Air Kenya).

Biwott's business philosophy of purchasing small or failing businesses, investing and re-investing in them over many years, appears to have paid dividends. He is now regarded as one of Kenya's wealthiest businessmen.

Biwott's businesses in Kenya employ thousands of people and one company of which he is the major shareholder, has for many years been listed among Kenya's top 10 corporate taxpayers.

Philanthropy

Mr Biwott supported a number of projects in the areas of education, health and medicine, and assisting small businesses. In 2008 he established the Mbegu Trust 'to develop education and opportunity in Kenya'.

Nicholas Biwott took a personal and active role in the development of education in Kenya, particularly the education of girls, through the building of numerous schools. These included the Maria Soti Educational Centre a model school for girls from all backgrounds built as a tribute to his mother, as well as the Biwott Secondary School.

Biwott also played an active role in raising funds for the building of many other colleges and educational projects, and was the founder and patron of the Keiyo South Education Foundation that provides bursaries to needy students for primary and secondary education.

Health and Medical Services

Nicholas Biwott led the development of multiple health and medical service projects, including at least two sub-district hospitals, three health centres and eight dispensaries.

For many years he also worked for and supported the National Fund for the Disabled of Kenya, of which from 1980 he was a member and trustee of the Management Committee, and the Advocacy, Publicity and Fundraising Committee, and ultimately its chairman.

Controversy 

Nicholas Biwott's name has been raised, 'perhaps unfairly ’ by his detractors both inside and outside Kenya regarding several controversies all which have date their origins to the years 1990–91. His supporters maintain that the allegations, none of which have ever been proved, arose from the campaign at the time to introduce multi-party democracy in Kenya coupled with Biwott's association with President Moi.

Biwott was named by Scotland Yard detective John Troon as a person of interest in the 1990 murder of Kenya's Foreign Affairs minister Robert Ouko. Troon's theories and the basis for them as to the motives for the murder have since been criticized. A recent documentary airing on NTV Kenya (13/02/2023), places Biwott as the principal killer of Ouko.

Ten government officials, including Biwott, were held in police custody for questioning for two weeks in November 1991 but a Kenyan Police investigation concluded that there was no 'evidence to support the allegations that Biwott was involved in the disappearance and subsequent death of the late minister Dr. Robert John Ouko'.

In December 2003, Biwott issued a formal complaint against New Scotland Yard through his lawyer on the basis that Troon's investigation was 'fundamentally flawed and, in many cases erroneous' and called on New Scotland Yard 'to investigate Troon' and to issue an apology. The request was ultimately turned down in December 2004 by the Metropolitan Police as the original investigation 'did not involve any UK "victim", potential suspect, or even witnesses', and because 'the resources of the Metropolitan Police are limited'. Another reason given for the refusal by the Metropolitan Police to review the case was that the Kenyan Parliamentary Select Committee was investigating the death of Dr Robert Ouko and that it was 'open to Mr Biwott to make any representations he wishes to that Inquiry'. The Select Committee's proceedings, however, were abruptly terminated as Nicholas Biwott began to give his testimony.

To date, the allegation that Biwott was involved in the murder of Dr Robert Ouko has never been factually substantiated. In a recent broadcast (March 2017) Episode Six "Lingering Doubts and Further Investigations" it is explained why the allegations against Nicholas Biwott were false, and summarise "It may be a hard truth for many Kenyans to swallow, but Nicholas Biwott clearly had no involvement in the murder of Robert Ouko."

In 2000, a Nairobi court awarded Mr Biwott record damages of Sh30 million arising from a case in which he sued a British journalist, Chester Stern, and others for linking him to the Ouko murder in a book entitled 'Dr Iain West's Casebook'. Chester Stern and the book's publishers, Little Brown, stated that they would "vigorously defend" the action but ultimately they did not do so and the case was uncontested. Earlier Biwott won Sh10 : million from Bookpoint, a popular Nairobi bookshop, for stocking copies of the book Dr Ian West's Casebook. In February 2023, James Khwatenge, a former special branch officer, claimed in an expose on national television that Biwott had shot Dr. Ouko in front of President Moi at the Nakuru Statehouse.

Death, memorial and funeral
On the morning of 11 July 2017, Biwott was rushed to Nairobi Hospital. He died of complications arising from kidney failure 30 minutes later.

A memorial service was held at Milimani AIC on 18 July 2017 followed on 20 July by a funeral service at the Maria Soti Girls Educational Centre Kaptarakwa, in Keiyo, Elgeyo/Marakwet County.

In the final speech of the funeral President Uhuru Kenyatta eulogized the late Biwott as a  "true patriot".
"When the history of this country is written, it will include many men and women in this country who quietly but firmly and confidently are responsible for what Kenya is today – a sound country, a stable country with a growing economy. And Nicholas Biwott is one of those people."

See also
 Corruption in Kenya
 Goldenberg scandal

References 

 Cohen, David William & Odhiambo, E. S. Atieno (2004). The Risks of Knowledge: Investigations into the Death of the Hon. Minister John Robert Ouko in Kenya, 1990. Ohio University Press. . Ohio University

External links
 Parliament.go.ke
 Nicholas Biwott: Kenya's power broker
 Hon.Nicholas Biwott 1940-2017

1941 births
2017 deaths
Corruption in Kenya
20th-century Kenyan businesspeople
Kenya African National Union politicians
Members of the National Assembly (Kenya)
Regional development and local governments ministers
University of Melbourne alumni
People from Elgeyo-Marakwet County
Kalenjin people
Ministers of Agriculture of Kenya
Energy ministers of Kenya
Industry ministers of Kenya
Science ministers of Kenya
Technology ministers of Kenya
Trade ministers of Kenya
Tourism ministers of Kenya